Nirna  is a village in the southern state of Karnataka, India. It is located in the Homnabad taluk of Bidar district.

Demographics
 India census, Nirna had a population of 8830 with 4529 males and 4301 females.

See also
 Bidar
 Districts of Karnataka

References

External links
 http://Bidar.nic.in/

Villages in Bidar district